Izzat (or Izzet) Kutebar ( – after 1858) was a Kyrgyz (or Kirghiz) rebel and guerrilla leader who was active from the 1820s to 1858. He first robbed the Bukhara caravan in 1822, and was at his height as a raider and scourge of the Russian invaders in the 1840s. They eventually persuaded him to suspend his activities and rewarded him with a gold medal, but he rebelled again in the early 1850s. He was captured in 1854 but he either escaped or was released.

Izzat raised a revolt of the Kirghiz against the Russian occupation of their lands and lived as a rebel in the Ust-Yurt. Russian expansion into central Asia was stalled and they were held on the Syr Darya for four years. In 1858, General Katenin, newly appointed as Russia's Governor-General of the Orenburg district, decided to attempt conciliation by offering a general amnesty to all rebels. At first, Izzat refused to enter into negotiations with the Russians but changed his mind after he learned about Nikolay Pavlovich Ignatyev's mission en route for Khiva and Bokhara. Izzat met Ignatyev and agreed to make his peace with Russia, promising future loyalty to the Tsar. Nothing is known of him after 1858.

In popular culture, Izzat is a major character in Flashman at the Charge (1973), written by George MacDonald Fraser. Although Izzat's character in the novel is loosely based upon him as a real person, Fraser added an appendix in which he summarised his researches of the real Izzat.

References 

19th-century Kyrgyzstani people
Year of birth uncertain